Slobodan Mazić (Serbian Cyrillic: Слободан Мазић; born November 15, 1977) is a Serbian footballer.

Career
Throuout his career, Mazić played for Serbian  FK Radnički Bajmok, FK Spartak Subotica and OFK Beograd, Bosnian-Serb FK Slavija Sarajevo, Cypriot Digenis Morphou, DAC 1904 Dunajska Streda, and Montenegrin OFK Grbalj and FK Budućnost Podgorica, FK Bačka Topola, SVSF Pottschach.

External links
 Profile at Srbijafudbal
 Profile and 2009-10 stats at FSCG

Living people
1977 births
Sportspeople from Subotica
Serbian footballers
Serbian expatriate footballers
FK Spartak Subotica players
OFK Beograd players
FK Slavija Sarajevo players
FK Budućnost Podgorica players
Digenis Akritas Morphou FC players
FC DAC 1904 Dunajská Streda players
2. Liga (Slovakia) players
Cypriot First Division players
Expatriate footballers in Cyprus
Expatriate footballers in Slovakia
Expatriate footballers in Montenegro
Expatriate footballers in Austria
Serbian expatriate sportspeople in Cyprus
Serbian expatriate sportspeople in Slovakia
Serbian expatriate sportspeople in Montenegro
Serbian expatriate sportspeople in Austria
Association football defenders